Angela Huth (born 29 August 1938) is an English novelist and journalist.

Early life and career
Huth is the daughter of the actor Harold Huth. She left school at age 16 in order to paint and to study art in both France and Italy. At 18 she travelled, mostly alone, across the United States before returning to England to work on a variety of newspapers and magazines. She married the journalist and travel writer Quentin Crewe in 1961 and with him had a daughter, Candida; they eventually divorced. She presented programmes on the BBC, including How It Is and Why and Man Alive.

She is now most recognised as a successful writer. She has written three collections of short stories and eleven novels. Her novel, Land Girls (1995), was a best-seller and was made into a 1998 feature film, The Land Girls starring Rachel Weisz and Anna Friel. A 2010 sequel was called Once a Land Girl. Both are about the land girls – British women who worked on farms during World War II while the men were fighting the war.

She also writes plays for radio, television and stage, and is a freelance journalist, critic and broadcaster. Her play The Understanding ran at the Strand Theatre in 1982 and starred Ralph Richardson and Joan Greenwood.

Huth recently edited a collection of eulogies, Well-Remembered Friends, including Seamus Heaney on Ted Hughes, Martin Amis on Kingsley Amis, and Alan Bennett on Peter Cook. She is a Fellow of the Royal Society of Literature.

Personal life
She has been married to a university don, James Howard-Johnston, since 1978. They live in Warwickshire and have one daughter.

Quotes about Huth 
"Huth inhabits all the lonely people with great compassion and makes them seem unbearably poignant. But she balances delicately, introducing comedy at awful, unlikely moments… Her eye for detail sometimes makes me think of Alan Bennett." — The Daily Telegraph

"Huth has an eye for perfect short-story material… She demonstrates an enviable ability to capture in small vignettes the very English quality of 'hanging on in quiet desperation'… A full technicolour storyteller who clearly enjoys herself." The Spectator

Bibliography
 , 1970
 , 1972
  , 1975
 , 1985
 , 1993 
 , 1977
 , 1995 
 , 1999 
 , 2000
 , 2003 
 , 2006 
 , 2006 
 , 2010

References

External links
Man Alive: Consenting Adults: 2. The Women - A 1967 documentary on lesbianism presented by Angela Huth 
A 2005 article in the Daily Telegraph on tap-dancing
Angela Huth information from St Giles' Church

1938 births
English journalists
20th-century English novelists
21st-century English novelists
Fellows of the Royal Society of Literature
Living people
Place of birth missing (living people)